The Solin is a  long river in the Loiret department in north-central France. It flows generally north-northeast. It is a left tributary of the Loing, into which it flows at Châlette-sur-Loing.

Communes along its course
This list is ordered from source to mouth: 
Loiret: Le Moulinet-sur-Solin, Montereau, La Cour-Marigny, Oussoy-en-Gâtinais, Vimory, Villemandeur, Châlette-sur-Loing.

References

Rivers of France
Rivers of Centre-Val de Loire
Rivers of Loiret